Nonparahalosydna is a genus of polychaetes belonging to the family Polynoidae.

Species:

Nonparahalosydna pleiolepis

References

Phyllodocida